Bear Lake High School is a public secondary school in Montpelier, Idaho, the only traditional high school of Bear Lake School District #33 and Bear Lake County.

Athletics
Bear Lake currently (2016-2017) competes in athletics in IHSAA Class 2A and is a member of the Southeastern Idaho Conference.

State titles
Boys
 Football (2): fall 1999, 2022 (A-3, now 2A) (official with introduction of A-3 playoffs, fall 1977)
 Cross Country (4): fall (3A) 2004, 2005, 2006, 2007  (introduced in 1964)

 Basketball (2): (A-2, now 3A) 1996, (2A) 2017 2018 too man  

Girls
 Cross Country (6): fall (3A) 2003, 2004, 2005, 2006, 2007, 2008  (introduced in 1974)

 Volleyball (5): fall (A-2, now 3A) 1997, 1998, 1999, 2000, 2001  (introduced in 1976)
 Basketball (1): (A-2, now 3A) 1998  (introduced in 1976)

References

External links
Bear Lake School District #33
MaxPreps.com - Bear Lake Bears

Public high schools in Idaho
Schools in Bear Lake County, Idaho